In mathematics, the Riesz–Thorin theorem, often referred to as the Riesz–Thorin interpolation theorem or the Riesz–Thorin convexity theorem, is a result about interpolation of operators.  It is named after Marcel Riesz and his student G. Olof Thorin.

This theorem bounds the norms of linear maps acting between  spaces. Its usefulness stems from the fact that some of these spaces have rather simpler structure than others. Therefore one may prove theorems about the more complicated cases by proving them in two simple cases and then using the Riesz–Thorin theorem to pass from the simple cases to the complicated cases. The Marcinkiewicz theorem is similar but applies also to a class of non-linear maps.

Motivation
First we need the following definition:

Definition. Let  be two numbers such that . Then for  define  by: .

Therefore, we have the following chain of inclusions:

In practice, we often encounter operators defined on the sumset .

It is therefore natural to investigate the behavior of such operators on the intermediate subspaces .

To this end, we go back to our example and note that the Fourier transform on the sumset  was obtained by taking the sum of two instantiations of the same operator, namely

These really are the same operator, in the sense that they agree on the subspace .

Statement of the theorem
There are several ways to state the Riesz–Thorin interpolation theorem; to be consistent with the notations in the previous section, we shall use the sumset formulation.

In other words, if  is simultaneously of type  and of type , then  is of type  for all . In this manner, the interpolation theorem lends itself to a pictorial description.

The interpolation theorem was originally stated and proved by Marcel Riesz in 1927. Olof Thorin extended the interpolation theorem to the entire square, removing the lower-triangle restriction. The proof of Thorin was originally published in 1938 and was subsequently expanded upon in his 1948 thesis.

Proof
We will first prove the result for simple functions and eventually show how the argument can be extended by density to all measurable functions.

Simple Functions
By symmetry, let us assume  (the case  trivially follows from ).

We readily see that  is an entire function, bounded on the strip . The left-hand side can be rewritten by means of the following lemma.

Equivalently, for a generic simple function,

Proof of 
Let us now prove that our claim is indeed certain. With a parallel argument, each  belongs to (at most) one of the sets supporting , say , and 

Extension to All Measurable Functions in 
So far, we have proven that  when  is a simple function.

Formally, let  and let  be a sequence of simple functions such that , for all , and  pointwise.

Then,  and  a.e. for some subsequence and, in turn,  a.e. Then, by Fatou’s lemma and recalling that holds true for simple functions,

Interpolation of analytic families of operators
The proof outline presented in the above section readily generalizes to the case in which the operator  is allowed to vary analytically. In fact, an analogous proof can be carried out to establish a bound on the entire function

from which we obtain the following theorem of Elias Stein, published in his 1956 thesis:

The theory of real Hardy spaces and the space of bounded mean oscillations permits us to wield the Stein interpolation theorem argument in dealing with operators on the Hardy space  and the space  of bounded mean oscillations; this is a result of Charles Fefferman and Elias Stein.

Applications

Hausdorff–Young inequality

It has been shown in the first section that the Fourier transform  maps  boundedly into  and  into itself. A similar argument shows that the Fourier series operator, which transforms periodic functions  into functions  whose values are the Fourier coefficients

maps  boundedly into  and  into . The Riesz–Thorin interpolation theorem now implies the following:

This is the Hausdorff–Young inequality.

The Hausdorff–Young inequality can also be established for the Fourier transform on locally compact Abelian groups. The norm estimate of 1 is not optimal. See the main article for references.

Convolution operators

Therefore the Riesz–Thorin theorem gives

So interpolating we get

where the connection between p, r and s is

The Hilbert transform

where p.v. indicates the Cauchy principal value of the integral. The Hilbert transform is a Fourier multiplier operator with a particularly simple multiplier:

It follows from the Plancherel theorem that the Hilbert transform maps  boundedly into itself.

We can show, however, that

for all Schwartz functions , and this identity can be used in conjunction with the Cauchy–Schwarz inequality to show that the Hilbert transform maps  boundedly into itself for all . Interpolation now establishes the bound

for all , and the self-adjointness of the Hilbert transform can be used to carry over these bounds to the  case.

Comparison with the real interpolation method
While the Riesz–Thorin interpolation theorem and its variants are powerful tools that yield a clean estimate on the interpolated operator norms, they suffer from numerous defects: some minor, some more severe. Note first that the complex-analytic nature of the proof of the Riesz–Thorin interpolation theorem forces the scalar field to be . For extended-real-valued functions, this restriction can be bypassed by redefining the function to be finite everywhere—possible, as every integrable function must be finite almost everywhere. A more serious disadvantage is that, in practice, many operators, such as the Hardy–Littlewood maximal operator and the Calderón–Zygmund operators, do not have good endpoint estimates. In the case of the Hilbert transform in the previous section, we were able to bypass this problem by explicitly computing the norm estimates at several midway points. This is cumbersome and is often not possible in more general scenarios. Since many such operators satisfy the weak-type estimates

real interpolation theorems such as the Marcinkiewicz interpolation theorem are better-suited for them. Furthermore, a good number of important operators, such as the Hardy-Littlewood maximal operator, are only sublinear. This is not a hindrance to applying real interpolation methods, but complex interpolation methods are ill-equipped to handle non-linear operators. On the other hand, real interpolation methods, compared to complex interpolation methods, tend to produce worse estimates on the intermediate operator norms and do not behave as well off the diagonal in the Riesz diagram. The off-diagonal versions of the Marcinkiewicz interpolation theorem require the formalism of Lorentz spaces and do not necessarily produce norm estimates on the -spaces.

Mityagin's theorem
B. Mityagin extended the Riesz–Thorin theorem; this extension is formulated here in the special case of spaces of sequences with unconditional bases (cf. below).

Assume:

Then

for any unconditional Banach space of sequences , that is, for any  and any , .

The proof is based on the Krein–Milman theorem.

See also 
 Marcinkiewicz interpolation theorem
 Interpolation space

Notes

References
 .
 
 .  Translated from the Russian and edited by G. P. Barker and G. Kuerti.
 .
 .

External links
 

Theorems involving convexity
Theorems in harmonic analysis
Theorems in Fourier analysis
Theorems in functional analysis
Banach spaces
Operator theory
Lp spaces